Stephostethus lardarius is a species of minute brown scavenger beetle in the family Latridiidae.

References

Further reading

External links

 

Latridiidae
Beetles described in 1775
Taxa named by Charles De Geer